The 2020–21 New Year's North American winter storm was a major storm system that brought a wide swath of snow and ice to parts of the High Plains and Central and Northeastern United States during the New Years holiday from December 30–January 2. The system began developing early on December 30, and began spreading wintry precipitation to parts of Texas, coalescing into a low pressure system that formed near the western Gulf of Mexico. The winter storm tracked north and brought heavy snow, ice and strong winds to much of the center of the Midwest and interior parts of the Northeast and New England, causing widespread impacts and travel issues.

Prior to the storm, Oklahoma declared a state of emergency for several dozen counties due to expected icy conditions; the ice storm came only a few months after a crippling ice storm impacted the state in late October. In other states, wintry weather caused up to 100,000 power outages. One person was killed by the storm in Missouri, due to treacherous roads. The storm caused over $35 million (2021 USD) in damages. It was unofficially named Winter Storm John by The Weather Channel.

Meteorological history
On December 30, an extratropical low formed over the northern Gulf of Mexico, to the south of Texas. Later that day, the low made landfall in southeastern Texas. In Western Texas, snow, freezing rain and sleet began to fall, prompting Winter Storm Warnings across the region and extending into Oklahoma. During the next couple of days, the system moved northeastward, strengthening and later bringing more wintry weather to the Northeast.

Preparations and impact
Ahead of and during the storm, the National Weather Service issued Winter Storm Watches and Warnings across a large swath of the Central United States, ranging from Texas to as far as Maine as the system progressed. In addition, Ice Storm Warnings were issued in parts of Illinois, particularly due to expected widespread ice accumulations of at least .

Central United States
The unusual severity of the winter weather led to the closure of parts of Interstate 10 in Texas, which stranded dozens of travelers that had to seek shelter in two school gyms in Marfa. Two migrants died after being caught in the storm in western Texas.

In Oklahoma, governor Kevin Stitt declared a state of emergency for 39 counties on December 31 due to the impending hazardous winter weather. In addition, ice accumulations caused major problems and thousands of power outages across the state, due to freezing rain accumulating on power lines and trees and weighing them down.

The Missouri Department of Transportation warned travelers to stay off the roadways due to the winter weather and ice. A jackknifed tractor-trailer resulted in the northbound lanes of Interstate 49 being closed early on January 1. A 38-year-old man was killed during the storm after being struck by another car when trying to warn residents about the icy roadways on January 1.

See also

 December 2013 North American storm complex
 December 2015 North American storm complex
 Ice storm
 January 2017 North American ice storm

References

External links
 2020 Storm Summaries from the Weather Prediction Center

2020–21 North American winter
2020 in Texas
2020 in Oklahoma
2020 in Missouri
Ice storms
December 2020 events in the United States